Northridge High School is part of Northridge Local Schools. The school is located in Dayton, Ohio, United States. The school mascot is the polar bear.  Northridge's mission is "Educating Today for Tomorrow's Success".

Northridge met nine of the 12 state indicators for the 2008–2009 school year, earning an "Effective" rating.

Ohio High School Athletic Association State Championships

 Boys Basketball – 1945 
Track - Boys-4 X 800 Relay (1988-1989)	- Scott Rairden, Mike Green, Brian Smith, Mike Banta 
Track - Boys-800 Meter Run (1994-1995) - C.J. Szekely 
Wrestling - 160 lb (1996-1997) - Shawn Brightman

Alumni

This is a partial list of notable alumni of Northridge High School (Dayton, Ohio). 
Joseph G. Lapointe Jr - received Medal of Honor
Frank J. Myers - Grammy winner, singer-songwriter of Baker & Myers
Robert Pollard - lead singer of Guided by Voices
Chris Spurling - Former MLB player (Detroit Tigers, Milwaukee Brewers)
Walter Hirsch - former college basketball player, central figure in point shaving scandal
Andrew Ogletree - tight end for the Indianapolis Colts, 2022 NFL Draft pick from Youngstown State.
Matt MacPherson - Associate Head Coach (Safeties) of Northwestern_Wildcats_football
Nolan R Jones - Associate Athletics Director for Football Operations of Appalachian State University
Jay Hooten - Director of Football Performance of Northwestern_Wildcats_football

References

External links
 Northridge Schools Website
 Northridge Dividends Monthly Newsletter
 Google Earth Model

High schools in Dayton, Ohio
Public high schools in Ohio
1933 establishments in Ohio
Educational institutions established in 1933